Let It Happen is an album by pianists Dick Hyman, Roland Hanna, Marian McPartland, and Hank Jones recorded in 1974 and released by the RCA label.

Reception

AllMusic reviewer Ken Dryden stated: "The Jazz Piano Quartet, with pianists Dick Hyman, Roland Hanna, Marian McPartland, and Hank Jones, was a one-time project, with the partial aim by RCA to introduce jazz fans to the wonders of quadraphonic sound ... While many folks think that piano duets often result in train wrecks, the recipe for disaster was even greater with four pianists recorded simultaneously without overdubbing. Other than some very basic charts written by Hyman to serve as a simple guide, all ten performances are improvised without the benefit of a single rehearsal; an even more stunning fact is that everything was nailed on the first take! ... although all four pianists have made many great recordings individually since this 1974 release, they should be very proud of their considerable accomplishments on this very collectable record. Highly recommended!."

Track listing
 "Lover, Come Back to Me" (Sigmund Romberg, Oscar Hammerstein II) – 2:22
 "Maiden Voyage" (Herbie Hancock) – 3:55
 "Let It Happen" (Ettore Stratta) – 4:21
 "Watch It!" (Dick Hyman) – 3:03
 "Here's That Rainy Day" (Jimmy Van Heusen, Johnny Burke) – 4:43
 "Variations on Scott Joplin's "Solace"" (Scott Joplin, Dick Hyman) – 3:38
 "You Are the Sunshine of My Life" (Stevie Wonder) – 3:45
 "Improvviso" (Hyman, Hanna, Jones, McPartland: based on a fragment by Erik Satie) – 6:48
 "Warm Valley" (Duke Ellington) – 3:38
 "How High the Moon" (Morgan Lewis, Nancy Hamilton) – 3:00

Personnel
Dick Hyman - piano, arranger
Roland Hanna, Hank Jones, Marian McPartland - piano

References
\

1974 albums
RCA Records albums
Dick Hyman albums
Roland Hanna albums
Hank Jones albums
Marian McPartland albums